Popstars: Girls forever is the ninth season of the German TV show Popstars, in which young aspiring female singers/dancers competed in order to claim their spots to make it into the next girl group. The contestants, who also lived together during the course of the series, were groomed and judged by choreographer Detlef D! Soost, and were judged on their vocal and dancing ability by manager Thomas Stein, who had previously been a judge on the first two seasons of Deutschland sucht den Superstar, and "Die Happy"-singer Marta Jandová, who is also about to write songs for the final band. This is the format for the ninth season of the Popstars series, focusing mostly on female dancers/singers, looking for fame in the music industry. This season's catch phrase is "Follow the Star". The season's promotional songs were Gabriella Cilmi's "On a Mission" redeemed by Monrose with "This Is Me", which also serves as the opening theme.

The show ran from Thursday, 19 August 2010, to 9 December 2010 on Pro7. The show will be repeated on VIVA on the following Friday, Sunday and Tuesday. Auditions were held in 16 German cities, not involving the judges appearing on TV, and through Online-Casting. The last chance to audition were four audition-dates in Offenbach and Duisburg in front of the real judges.

A so-called "Talent Check" was held after the castings to see which girls were talented enough to be a popstar. The "Talent Check" was followed by four weeks of workshop in a band-house in Munich. The remaining girls were invited to Nashville, Tennessee, United States, for another kind of workshop in another luxurious band-house. Following those eight weeks of workshop were four weeks of live shows for the remaining girls. During the live shows the audience decided the name of the band and which four girls would form the new band (the members by televoting the name by voting on the official site). Throughout the live shows the girls were coached by stars and also performed with them on-stage.

Contestants

Successful contestants 
Sarah Rensing (22), cosmetician from Ahlen. She was announced the first band member of LaVive in the Live Show I. A reception two days later was organised for Sarah Rensing in Ahlen's town hall.
Meike Ehnert (23), babysitter from Schwarzenbach. She was announced the second band member of LaVive in the Live Show II.
Julia Köster (17), student from Oberhausen. She was announced the third band member of LaVive in the Live Show III.
Katrin Mehlberg (19), student from Duisburg. She was announced the fourth band member of LaVive in the Live Show IV.

Eliminated contestants 
Esra Ünver (16), student from Moers, was eliminated after her third performance in the Live Show IV.
Pascaline N'Sanda (19), student from Hennef, was eliminated after her second performance in the Live Show IV.
Yonca Cakmak (22), student from Kassel, was eliminated after her first performance in the Live Show IV.
Diba Hakimi (20), office clerk from Hamburg, was eliminated after her performance in the Live Show III.
Jenny Gerdts (26), dental assistant from Hemmoor, was eliminated after her performance in the Live Show II.
Claudia Markow (26), travel agent from Stuttgart, was eliminated after her performance in the Live Show I.
Ines (23), prospective nursery nurse, was eliminated after her performance in the Girls@Work Band-house IV.
Isabelle (23), student from Mainz-Kastel, originally from Switzerland, was eliminated after her performance in the Girls@Work Band-house II.
Sonni (18), apprentice from Mannheim, was eliminated after her performance in the Girls@Work Band-house I.
Jessica (20), student from Fulda, came into competition through an online-casting but withdrew before travelling to the Girls@Work Workshop in Nashville.
Rosalie (16), from Aachen, originally from Democratic Republic of the Congo, was eliminated after her performance in the Workshop IV.
Sash (19), barber apprentice from Aachen, was eliminated after her performance in the Workshop III.
Angel-Ann (18), student from Herten, was eliminated after her performance in the Workshop III.
Maria (19), potential student from Flörsheim, originally from Italy, came into competition through an online-casting, but was eliminated after her performance in the Workshop II.
Jasmin Hafidi (19), from Wiesbaden, was eliminated after her performance in the Workshop I.
Milka (22), barber apprentice from Lindenschied, had a dispute with Detlef "D!" Soost after her elimination after her performance in the Workshop I, because of her surprising exit.
Dilara (16), student from Ludwigshafen am Rhein likes singing, swimming and shopping, and was eliminated after her performance in the Talent Check.
Chantal (17), student from Oberasbach, having roots in America, likes dancing, singing and meeting friends, and was eliminated after her performance in the Talent Check.
Denise (19), from Lüdenscheid came into competition through an online-casting, but was eliminated after her performance in the Talent Check.
Gloria Wind (26), from Hamburg came into competition through an online-casting, but withdrew before the training for the Talent Check performance began.
Betty (23), student from Hamburg, made it through the auditions, but withdrew and did not appear at the Talent Check.

(Ages stated are at time of contest)

Episodes

Episode 01: Casting I 

First Aired: 19 August 2010

The jury is very surprised by Meike because of her great voice.
As the jury couldn't decide whether Betty or Svenja should get the chance to attend the Talent Check, they let them have a singing battle, for which they were coached by Marit Larsen.

Selected 5: Dilara, Meike, Rosalie, Claudia, Betty

Episode 02: Casting II 

First Aired: 26 August 2010

The singing battle was fought between Ita and Angel-Ann. They were coached by Monrose.

Selected 5: Isabelle, Sonni, Sarah, Yonca, Angel-Ann

Episode 03: Casting III 

First Aired: 2 September 2010

The singing battle was held between Esra and Jasmin. The girls were coached by Aura Dione for their battle.

Selected: Milka, Jenny, Pascaline, Katrin, Esra

Episode 04: Casting IV 

First Aired: 9 September 2010

Sash and Gloria were coached by Gabriella Cilmi for their battle.

Selected: Diba, Ines, Jasmin, Chantal, Julia, Sash

Episode 05: Talent Check 

First Aired: 16 September 2010

In addition to the personal castings there were online castings held for four weeks. The girls chosen by the jury were Maria, Denise, Gloria, Jessica.

Critical audience, prominent visitations and another rivalry: The 21 potential Popstars that were selected at the auditions, met each other in Munich for the first time. Before this week's groups were announced, the judges had a surprise for the girls: The online contestants were introduced to the other girls at the Talent Check. Every girl had to sing in front of the jury again. Gloria was given bad criticism and withdrew. The girls performed on stage in front of their families and friends for the first time. Scottish singer Amy Macdonald supported the potentials and gave some advice. Denise, Chantal and Dilara were eliminated.

Episode 06: Workshop I – "Spotlight" 

First Aired: 23 September 2010

The girls were coached by Ne-Yo, e.g. they had to remove all their make up and sing an acoustic-version of a very personal song and show their emotions in a close-up. There was dispute between the girls as they all live in one house. Jasmin and Milka were eliminated.

Episode 07: Workshop II – "The Look" 

First Aired: 30 September 2010

The girls got a haircut and trained their skills in different music video shoots ("California Gurls" by Katy Perry, "Whenever, Wherever" by Shakira, "Earth Song" by Michael Jackson and "Numb" by U2). After having an allergic reaction Ines was rushed to a hospital. She didn't perform with the other girls but was given the option to come back as soon as she was well again. Rosalie caused some trouble as she broke the rules and left the house. She stated to want to go home but stayed anyway. Kim Wilde helped the girls look-wise. Maria was eliminated.

Episode 08: Workshop III – "Under Pressure" 

First Aired: 7 October 2010

The girls were taught by Regina Halmich and Culcha Candela. Rosalie and Katrin, who were estranged since the last episode, conciliated. Angel-Ann was replaced as bandleader due to her weak leading abilities. Diba was made bandleader instead. Ines recovered and moved back into the house. Angel-Ann and Sash were eliminated. After the elimination Sash was accused for stealing stuff from the other girls.

Episode 09: Workshop IV – "Golden Voices" 

First Aired: 14 October 2010

After having been brought to a church by judge Marta, the girls got to meet Paul Potts and had to sing an acoustic version of either "Hallelujah" or "Ave Maria" in the same church. Rosalie once again disrupted her group by disputing with Pascaline and several other candidates. The girls moved out of their house and travelled to a dripstone cave inside which they performed their songs. The girls' families came to watch the show, Meike was the only one not to have attendants. Every group was praised for their performance. Esra burnt her arm during their group's performance because she was positioned near the fire and refused to move away because she didn't want to break the performance. This example of her 180°-Twist in teamwork was positively mentioned by D.
After having been eliminated, Rosalie suffered a nervous breakdown.

Episode 10: Girls@Work I – "Let Me Entertain You" 

First Aired: 21 October 2010

Jessica withdrew. The girls travelled to Nashville and moved into another kind of bandhouse. Meike was the last one to move into a room with the other girls and was therefore criticized again for being a self-inflicted outsider. Robbie Williams was the artist coaching them this week. He was specially fond of Esra, described her as naughty and charismatic and chose her along with Meike, Sarah and Isabelle to perform his song "Feel". The girls were brought to a famous recording studio and got the chance to get a salaried job. Pascaline, Jenny and Yonca got the job and therefore recorded a song. Sonni was eliminated.

Episode 11: Girls@Work II – "Express Yourself" 

First Aired: 28 October 2010

The girls got to meet Kevin Richardson, former member of Backstreet Boys. After performing their favourite song for him, he chose four girls, Julia, about whom he said she had the best voice, Meike, Katrin and Claudia, to sing backing vocals for his new song. This week's band-leaders, Julia, Yonca, Ines and Sarah, got to meet Maroon 5 and sing backing vocals for their rehearsal, however they had to act as the band's roadies. After doing a rehearsal of their performances in front of all the other girls, Detlef D! Soost asked the girls to each tell him in front of the entire group the two girls they could imagine least to be in a band with. Everyone chose Esra and, along with Meike herself, Meike.
Isabelle was eliminated.

Episode 12: Girls@Work III – "Country Feeling" 

First Aired: 4 November 2010

Detlef D! Soost announced that one of the girls gets to sing the American national anthem ahead of a football game at the Vanderbilt Stadium in Nashville. Sarah was the one who got the job. For another job, recording a song for the soundtrack of German comedy Hanni & Nanni, the girls had to perform their favourite song in front of the client again. Sarah and Julia were the ones who got the job and therefore recorded a song. On the following day, the girls had to perform country-songs with backing bands in so-called honky-tonks and had to collect money for their show. Therefore, the girls were split into groups. The group who earned the most consisted of Katrin, Yonca and Diba. Throughout the week Meike has been criticized for being an outsider again. For this week's performances the girls sang with Meg Pfeiffer and her band. No one was eliminated.

Episode 13: Girls@Work IV – "Showdown" 

First Aired: 11 November 2010

This week's band-leaders, Jenny, Diba and Pascaline, were invited to an American breakfast television-show where they had to promote their upcoming performances. The girls got to record a song together, a cover of hit single I Swear by All-4-One. Three of the girls, Julia, Esra and Jenny, got to perform Smile by and with Uncle Kracker. During the actual show there girls got to perform Hey, Soul Sister by and with Train. Ines was eliminated.

Episode 14: Liveshow I 

First Aired: 18 November 2010

After a one-week voting on the official Pro7-homepage, the band name "LaViVe" was revealed. The girls performed their cover of "I Swear" with Gary Baker. Robbie Williams and Gary Barlow performed their song "Shame". The girls did solo performances. Claudia was eliminated and it was revealed that Sarah was the first band member.

Episode 15: Liveshow II 

First Aired: 25 November 2010

The second live show was part of ProSieben's Red Nose Day campaign.
The first single is called "No Time for Sleeping".

Episode 16: Liveshow III 

First Aired: 2 December 2010

Episode 17: Liveshow IV 

First Aired: 9 December 2010

Elimination's call-out order 

 The contestant was eliminated
 The contestant was band-leader
 The contestant was the best band-leader and was therefore safe from elimination
 The contestant was band-leader and was eliminated
 The contestant quit the competition
 The contestant won the competition

Guest performances 
In addition, songs are played during the episodes to promote an artist, single, album, or the show itself. Included is a list of those songs with their Media Control Top 100 reactions.

Television ratings

Germany

References

External links 
Official website
Official Facebook account
Official Warner Music label website
 

Girls forever
2010 German television seasons